Mount Pisgah Christian School is a private Christian school located in Johns Creek, Georgia, United States. It is located on Nesbit Ferry Road off of Highway 19.

The school is accredited by the Southern Association of Colleges and Schools (SACS) and the Southern Association of Independent Schools (SAIS) including memberships with the National Association of Independent Schools (NAIS), the Georgia High School Association (GHSA) and the Atlanta Christian School Association (ACSA).

History
Mount Pisgah Christian School was founded in 1986 by Mount Pisgah United Methodist Church with the goal of providing an enriching program for students in a Christian environment.

The school opened with 70 preschool students and has rapidly grown and expanded. In 1991, construction began on a new Lower School to house the burgeoning student population and quickly grew to include a Middle and Upper School. It wasn't until 2001 that Mount Pisgah began offering a high school education. Fourteen years later, Mount Pisgah has made significant upgrades in its short history. The most recent upgrade consisted of a new education building, Geier Hall. Mount Pisgah now offers a premier preschool, both half and full day programs, as well as Junior Kindergarten through twelfth grade.

Location

Mount Pisgah Christian School includes three campuses, located at the major intersection of Old Alabama and Nesbit Ferry Roads in Johns Creek, Georgia, plus the Patriot Athletic Campus on Brumbelow Road.

The school's address is: 9875 Nesbit Ferry Road, Johns Creek, Georgia 30022

Academics
Mount Pisgah Christian School's main academic goal is to prepare students for college. They serve students from age six weeks through 12th grade.

They offer AP classes in art, biology, chemistry, English, government, history, math, and foreign language. Recent graduates were accepted to the nation's top universities including Princeton, Cornell, Dartmouth, Georgia Tech, Wake Forest, and more. Students are required to complete 23 academic credits in the Upper School to graduate. 94% of Mount Pisgah graduates were accepted to their college of first choice.

Organizations and clubs include Habitat for Humanity, Future Business Leaders of America, Student Government, Robotics and more.

Fine arts
Mount Pisgah Christian School offers fine arts for the elementary, middle, and high school. Specifically, the high school offers art, chorus, yearbook, media production, and web design.

Athletics

Mount Pisgah Christian Patriots participates in athletics at all levels, but for the high school, they compete in the Georgia High School Association, also known as the GHSA. Mount Pisgah Christian has been in the GHSA for over ten years. Mount Pisgah's football is their most historically dominant team.  Mount Pisgah offers high school baseball, boys' and girls' basketball, cheerleading, cross country, football, wrestling, golf, softball, boys' and girls' soccer, boys' and girls' tennis, track and field, volleyball and lacrosse.

The school also has a middle school equestrian team and an upper school varsity equestrian team. These teams are both part of the national Interscholastic Equestrian Association (IEA).

This is where current Arlington Renegades player Kyle Sloter attended high school.

References

External links
 

1986 establishments in Georgia (U.S. state)
Christian schools in Georgia (U.S. state)
Educational institutions established in 1986
Private elementary schools in Georgia (U.S. state)
Private high schools in Georgia (U.S. state)
Private middle schools in Georgia (U.S. state)
Roswell, Georgia
Schools in Fulton County, Georgia